English electronic music band Ladytron have released seven studio albums, one live album, eight compilation albums, six extended plays, 20 singles, one promotional single, one video album and 19 music videos. Formed in 1999 in Liverpool, Merseyside, the band consists of Helen Marnie (lead vocals, synthesisers), Mira Aroyo (vocals, synthesisers), Daniel Hunt (synthesisers, electric guitar, vocals) and Reuben Wu (synthesisers).

The band's sound blends electropop with new wave and shoegazing elements. Ladytron have described their sound as "electronic pop". They focused on a balance between pop structures and experimental sounds. Some of the group's songs performed by Aroyo contain lyrics written in her native Bulgarian.

Ladytron took their name from the 1972 song of the same name by Roxy Music. Former Roxy Music member Brian Eno has described Ladytron as "the best of English pop music".

Albums

Studio albums

Live albums

Compilation albums

Extended plays

Singles

Promotional singles

Other appearances

Videography

Video albums

Music videos

References

External links
 
 
 
 

Discographies of British artists
Electronic music discographies
Pop music group discographies